General elections were held in South Africa on 22 April 2009 to elect members of the National Assembly and provincial legislatures. These were the fourth general elections held since the end of the apartheid era.

The North Gauteng High Court ruled on 9 February 2009 that South African citizens living abroad should be allowed to vote in elections. The judgment was confirmed by the Constitutional Court on 12 March 2009, when it decided that overseas voters who were already registered would be allowed to vote. Registered voters who found themselves outside their registered voting districts on election day were also permitted to vote for the national ballot at any voting station in South Africa.

The result was a victory for the ruling African National Congress (ANC), which won 264 of the 400 seats in the National Assembly, a fifteen seat reduction compared to the 2004 elections and losing its two-thirds supermajority. ANC leader Jacob Zuma remained president.

Background and campaign

African National Congress – ruling party
The African National Congress was the ruling party in parliament going into the 2009 elections, having won 69.69% of the vote at the 2004 elections. During its term in office a number of internal changes occurred, the primary one being the election of Jacob Zuma to the party presidency ahead of Thabo Mbeki at the 52nd National Conference of the African National Congress held on 18 December 2007. Zuma's victory in the election was partly due to the wide degree of support for him from the ANC Youth League, the South African Communist Party and the Congress of South African Trade Unions.

Subsequent to this, in 2008 Zuma's ongoing corruption trial in relation to a multi-billion Rand arms deal was dismissed by the courts, which insinuated that Mbeki had unduly influenced the investigation into Zuma. In light of the court's findings, the ANC's National Executive Committee asked Mbeki to resign as president of the country, which he duly did on 20 September 2008.

Mbeki was replaced by Kgalema Motlanthe, who had been elected as ANC deputy president at the 2007 conference. Motlanthe was not the presidential candidate of the ANC for the 2009 general election, but rather the current President of the ANC, Jacob Zuma. The ANC's electoral list was led by Zuma, followed by Motlanthe, Deputy President of South Africa Baleka Mbete, finance minister Trevor Manuel and Winnie Mandela, former wife of Nelson Mandela.

The recall of Mbeki, amongst other issues, created severe tensions and splits within the party, and eventually led to the formation of the Congress of the People, a new political party formed by former ANC members.  Nevertheless, most pre-poll predictions gave the ANC between sixty and seventy per cent of the popular vote; even the lowest prediction, giving the ANC 47 per cent, still rendered it comfortably South Africa's most favoured political party.

Democratic Alliance – official opposition 
The Democratic Alliance, South Africa's main opposition party, had undergone a leadership change, with Cape Town mayor and former anti-apartheid activist Helen Zille having succeeded long-serving Tony Leon in May 2007.

With a disproportionate focus on the Western Cape province, which it had identified as winnable, the DA launched its election campaign with the slogan "Vote to Win". It released its manifesto on 14 February.

The party was expected to perform strongly in the Western Cape, with analysts suggesting it would take control of the province from the ruling ANC. The ANC's support in the province was on the wane, while the DA had performed well in by-elections in the province leading up to the poll.

The party projected that it would govern in the Western Cape province – a task made easier by the ANC-COPE split – though it expected to need to form a governing coalition in order to do so. The party anticipated that it would take control of several other major cities and towns in the 2011 local elections, and, with what it termed a "realignment of SA politics", predicted it would take its "winning streak" into the 2014 elections, when it plans to challenge for the mantle of ruling party.

The DA's relationship with ANC breakaway party Cope started strongly. Cope leader Mosiuoa Lekota showed a willingness to co-operate with Zille in the future. Subsequently, Zille criticised COPE's internal structures and suggested many of the party's new members were merely Mbeki loyalists hoping to resurrect defunct political careers.

In the closing stages of the DA's campaign, it launched its "Stop Zuma" drive, which came under considerable criticism in the press—political analysts dubbing the tactic an example of "negative" politics. Zille later retorted, however, that what was really negative was the idea of handing over the right to change the Constitution unilaterally to Jacob Zuma and his "closed, crony network", as they would abuse that right both to enrich themselves and to protect themselves from prosecution. She later claimed the decline in the ANC's support base and the concomitant increase in that of her own party was a result of the DA 'Stop Zuma' campaign.

Electoral system
The 400 members of the National Assembly were elected by closed list proportional representation; two hundred members were elected from national party lists and 200 from provincial party lists in each of the nine provinces. The President of South Africa was chosen by the National Assembly after the election; in 2009, the presidential election was held on 6 May. The premiers of each province are chosen by the winning majority in each provincial legislature.

Boycott
A number of communities, organisations, social movements and well-known personalities threatened not to vote in the 2009 elections. The most well-known personality was Archbishop Desmond Tutu who at first said he would not vote but then changed his mind. South Africa's Poor People's Alliance, the Anti-Privatisation Forum, NOPE, and the independent farmworkers' union Sikhula Sonke resolved to boycott the election under the banner No Land! No House! No Vote!.

Results

The ANC, which has been in power since 1994, obtained 65.90% of valid votes cast on the national ballot, making it just shy of being able to change the constitution. The DA retained its position as the official opposition and also won the election in the Western Cape province with an outright majority.

Some 23-million people were registered for the 2009 general elections, which was about 2.5 million more than in 2004. There was a 77.3% turnout of registered voters, 1.34% of whom spoiled their ballots rendering them invalid. About 12-million people eligible to vote either did not register to vote (about 7-million), or did register but did not vote (5.4 million). In this election, there was a slight decrease in voter abstention though there was at least one high-profile election and registration boycotts campaign, the No Land! No House! No Vote! Campaign.

The Independent Electoral Commission made results available on their website as they were received from voting districts, filtered by national, provincial, municipality, and voting district.

National Assembly

Provincial legislatures
The following table summarises the results of the elections to the provincial legislatures. The majority party in each province is indicated in bold.

Eastern Cape

Free State

Gauteng

KwaZulu-Natal

Limpopo

Mpumalanga

North West

Northern Cape

Western Cape

NCOP seats
The National Council of Provinces (NCOP) consists of 90 members, ten elected by each provincial legislature. The Members of NCOP have to be elected in proportion to the party membership of the provincial legislature.

{| class=wikitable  style=text-align:right
!colspan=2 rowspan=2|Party
!rowspan=2|Delegate type
!colspan=9 style="text-align:center"|Province
!colspan=2 rowspan=2|Total
|-
!EC
!FS
!G
!KZN
!L
!M
!NW
!NC
!WC
|-
|bgcolor= rowspan=2|
|align=left rowspan=2|African National Congress
|align=left|Permanent
|4
|4
|4
|4
|5
|5
|4
|3
|2
|35
|rowspan=2|62
|-
|align=left|Special
|3
|3
|3
|3
|4
|4
|3
|3
|1
|27
|-
|bgcolor= rowspan=2|
|align=left rowspan=2|Democratic Alliance
|align=left|Permanent
|1
|1
|1
|1
|
|1
|1
|1
|3
|10
|rowspan=2|13
|-
|align=left|Special
|
|
|1
|
|
|
|
|
|2
|3
|-
|bgcolor= rowspan=2|
|align=left rowspan=2|Congress of the People
|align=left|Permanent
|1
|1
|1
|
|1
|
|1
|1
|1
|7
|rowspan=2|8
|-
|align=left|Special
|
|
|
|
|
|
|
|1
|
|1
|-
|bgcolor= rowspan=2|
|align=left rowspan=2|Independent Democrats
|align=left|Permanent
|
|
|
|
|
|
|
|1
|
|1
|rowspan=2|2
|-
|align=left|Special
|
|
|
|
|
|
|
|
|1
|1
|-
|bgcolor= rowspan=2|
|align=left rowspan=2|Inkatha Freedom Party
|align=left|Permanent
|
|
|
|1
|
|
|
|
|
|1
|rowspan=2|2
|-
|align=left|Special
|
|
|
|1
|
|
|
|
|
|1
|-
|bgcolor=| ||align=left|Freedom Front Plus
|align=left|Special
|
|1
|
|
|
|
|
|
|
|colspan=2|1
|-
|bgcolor=| ||align=left|United Christian Democratic Party
|align=left|Special
|
|
|
|
|
|
|1
|
|
|colspan=2|1
|-
|bgcolor=| ||align=left|United Democratic Movement
|align=left|Special
|1
|
|
|
|
|
|
|
|
|colspan=2|1
|-
!colspan="3" style="text-align:left"|Total
!10
!10
!10
!10
!10
!10
!10
!10
!10
!colspan=2|90
|}

Aftermath 

The ANC received widespread congratulations for its decisive national victory, both from international and domestic sources. This included the opposition, with DA leader Helen Zille acknowledging that the people had given it a strong mandate to rule. "We trust that the ANC will not abuse this confidence, and will govern well and in the interests of all South Africans." However, with 65.9% of the vote and 264 seats in the National Assembly (down from 74.3% and 297 seats), the ANC no longer had the two-thirds majority it needed to change the Constitution unilaterally. The governing party had lost considerable support in 8 of the 9 provinces, partially compensated for by a big increase in KwaZulu-Natal at the expense of the IFP.

Thanking supporters the following week, DA leader Helen Zille related proudly that her party had achieved all three of its primary objectives: it had kept the ANC below a two-thirds majority (albeit only just), won an outright majority in the Western Cape and significantly improved its standing in parliament. Zille saw the results as a vindication of the party's statement at the beginning of its campaign that the only two genuine political forces in South Africa were the DA and the ANC, with the latter losing support while the former consistently gained it, and voters refusing to waste their ballots on small, insignificant parties.

See also
African National Congress candidates for the 2009 South African general election
List of political parties in South Africa
2011 South African municipal election
25th South African Parliament

References

General election
General elections in South Africa
General election
South Africa